is a district in the borough of Altona within the Free and Hanseatic City of Hamburg in North Germany. In 2020 its population was 11,352. Iserbrook belongs to the Elbvororte (suburbs that are near the river Elbe).

Geography
According to the statistical office of Hamburg and Schleswig-Holstein, the district of Iserbook has a total area of 2.7 km2.

The western border connects to the district of Sülldorf. In the East is the district of Osdorf and to the North Iserbrook borders the state of Schleswig-Holstein and the town of Schenefeld. The southern border connects to the district of Blankenese and Nienstedten.

Demographics
In 2007, 10,660 people were living in Iserbrook. Therefore, the population density was 3,998 people per km2. Of the population, 16.8% were children under the age of 18, and 26.5% were 65 years of age or older. 283 people were registered as unemployed (<2%), 10% of those being under the age of 25.

In 1999 there were 5,370 households, out of which 19% had children under the age of 18 living with them and more than 40% of all households were made up of individuals. The average household size was less than 2.

In 2007, there were 538 criminal offences. With 50 crimes per 1,000 people Iserbook is among the lowest rates of all districts in Hamburg where the average is 136 crimes per 1,000 people.

Education
In 2008, there were no secondary schools and two elementary schools in Iserbrook.

Politics
These are the results of Iserbrook in the Hamburg state election:

Culture
Iserbook is home to the Martin-Luther-Kirche, Iserbrook, which is part of the parish of Sülldorf-Iserbrook. The parish Sülldorf-Iserbrook was formed in 2005 due to financial constraints in the parishes.

Sports
On the southern edge, between Iserbook and Blankenese, there is the indoor pool "Simrockbad". Opposite this, there are some playing fields of the sports club FTSV Komet Blankenese.

Infrastructure

Health systems
In Iserbrook there are not less than 12 day care centers for children and as well as 15 physicians in private practices and 2 pharmacies.

Transportation
Iserbrook station is serviced by the rapid transit system (Line S1) of the city train. Public transport is also provided by buses. Both are operated by the HVV.

According to the Department of Motor Vehicles (Kraftfahrt-Bundesamt), there were 4,467 private cars registered (379 cars/1000 people) in Iserbrook. The Bundesstrasse 431 (one of the biggest East-West transits in North Germany) is passing to connect Altona with Meldorf in Schleswig-Holstein.

Notes

References

 Statistical office Hamburg and Schleswig-Holstein Statistisches Amt für Hamburg und Schleswig-Holstein, official website 

Quarters of Hamburg
Altona, Hamburg